Brachychiton spectabilis is a tree of the genus Brachychiton found in northern Australia. It was described by Gordon Guymer in 1988.

Notes

References

spectabilis
Malvales of Australia
Trees of Australia
Ornamental trees
Drought-tolerant trees